The 2013 CME Group Titleholders was the third CME Group Titleholders, a women's professional golf tournament and the season-ending event on the U.S.-based LPGA Tour. It was played November 21–24 at the Gold Course of Tiburón Golf Club in Naples, Florida.

The top three finishers who were LPGA members from each official LPGA tournament, not otherwise qualified, earned a spot in the Titleholders. If tied, the player with the lower final round score qualified.

Shanshan Feng posted rounds of 67 and 66 on the weekend to win with a score of 273 (−15), one stroke ahead of runner-up Gerina Piller. The winner's share was the largest of the year at $700,000, 35% of the $2 million purse.

Qualifiers

Note: The following qualifiers did not play in the event: Christel Boeljon, Nicole Castrale, Mina Harigae, Haeji Kang, Teresa Lu, Haru Nomura, Se Ri Pak, Jiyai Shin, Yani Tseng.

Final leaderboard
Sunday, November 24, 2013

Source:

References

External links

Coverage on LPGA Tour's official site
Tiburón Golf Club − official site

CME Group Tour Championship
Golf in Florida
CME Group Titleholders
CME Group Titleholders
CME Group Titleholders
CME Group Titleholders